South Galloway Township is a township in Christian County, in the U.S. state of Missouri.

South Galloway Township was named for the old Galloway family.

References

Townships in Missouri
Townships in Christian County, Missouri